Wibtada El Mishwar is the album of songs recorded by the singers collectively known as Super Stars '05 featuring the 16 finalists from Super Star 2. The winner of Super Star 2, Ayman El Aatar is not featured on this CD as he was recording his debut CD بحبك at the same time. This album was delayed in released due to the assassination of Rafik Hariri.

Track listing
 راح ولا جاش (Rah Wala Jash) by Ranim Qteit
 من أول يوم (Min Awal Youm) by Brigitte Yaghi
 قربني ليك (Arabni Leek) by Zahi Saffeyeh
 أحلى حكاية (Ahla Hekaya) by Yasmine El Husaini
 بخيال الوردي (Bikheelil El Wardi) by Houssam El Chami
 نزلوا نجوم الليل (Nizlou Njoum El Leel) by Abir Nameh
 هذه الدنيا (Hazzi El Dunia) by Abd El Rahman Mohamed
 راجع (Raje') by Ammar Hassan
 بستاهل قلبك (Bistahel Albek) by Hadi Aswad
 قولوا (Koul Lah) by Mohannad Mshallah
 جدي (Jadi) by Houssam Madanieh
 ناداني الحب (Nadani El Hob) by Wa'ad El Bahry
 آسف (Asef) by Mohamed Daoud
 اقولك ايه (Aollak Eih) by Mustafa Shwiekh
 رغم جرحك (Ragham Jirahik) by Rania Shaban
 اعشق عيونك (Asha' Oyounak) by Raneen El Sha'ar

See also
Super Star
Arab music

2005 albums
Arabic-language albums